"Let's Go Fly a Kite" is a song from Walt Disney's 1964 film Mary Poppins, composed by Richard M. Sherman and Robert B. Sherman. This song is performed at the end of the film when George Banks (played by David Tomlinson), realizes that his family is much more important than his job. He mends his son's kite and takes his family on a kite-flying outing. The song is sung by Tomlinson, Dick Van Dyke and eventually the entire chorus.

In keeping with Mr Banks's change in character, this song was pre-recorded, and thus sung normally, by Tomlinson, rather than in his previous talk-singing in the Rex Harrison style, seen earlier in "The Life I Lead." This musical number also appears in the Sing Along Songs series of Disney videos.

Development
Although the notion of Mary Poppins gliding down a kite is mentioned incidentally in one of the P.L. Travers books, the metaphor of the mended kite (being a symbol of the mended Banks family) is taken from the 1961 Sherman Brothers screenplay treatment.  The song was inspired by the Sherman Brothers' father, Al Sherman, who besides being a well-known songwriter in his day was also an amateur kite maker who made kites for neighbourhood children as a weekend hobby.

The song was originally written in 4/4 or common time, but Walt Disney felt it was too much like the ending of a Broadway show and wanted a song that was more "breezy", like a waltz.  The song was recrafted into a 3/4 waltz-like arrangement. The key of this song is also in B flat and has the flats of E flat and B flat

The song appears in the 2004 stage musical version as well, but closer to the middle of the show and not at the show's end. In this version, the scene recreates what happens at the beginning of the second book when Mary Poppins came back on the string of Michael's kite.

It is often rumoured that Walt Disney had asked his songwriters to write a song about a kite because of his two daughters. Both of his daughters are members of the Kappa Alpha Theta sorority and their symbol is a kite. The song "Let's Go Fly a Kite" is sometimes believed to be dedicated to Kappa Alpha Theta.

Referenced in "Let's Go Fly a Coot".

Cover versions
On 6 April 2015 a version by Burl Ives featured on BBC's The One Show.

British Classical Number 1 Soprano, Joanna Forest released a fully orchestrated duet with Andy Day as the first single on her 2nd album, The Rhythm of Life, in February 2019

Literary sources
 Sherman, Robert B. Walt's Time: from before to beyond. Santa Clarita: Camphor Tree Publishers, 1998.

References

1964 songs
David Tomlinson songs
Dick Van Dyke songs
Songs from Mary Poppins
Songs written by the Sherman Brothers
Works about kite flying